Lake Lowndes State Park is a public recreation area in the U.S. state of Mississippi located off Mississippi Highway 69 approximately  southeast of Columbus, Mississippi.

Activities and amenities
The state park features boating, waterskiing and fishing on  Lowndes Lake, primitive and developed campsites, cabins and cottages,  of hiking and equestrian trails, visitors center with gymnasium, tennis courts and play fields, picnic area, and an 18-hole disc golf course, Whispering Pines.

References

External links

Lake Lowndes Depth Map Mississippi Department of Wildlife, Fisheries, and Parks

State parks of Mississippi
Protected areas of Lowndes County, Mississippi
Lowndes
Landforms of Lowndes County, Mississippi